Dolní Bukovsko is a market town České Budějovice District in the South Bohemian Region of the Czech Republic. It has about 1,700 inhabitants.

Administrative parts
Villages of Bzí, Horní Bukovsko, Hvozdno, Pelejovice, Popovice, Radonice and Sedlíkovice are administrative parts of Dolní Bukovsko.

History
The first written mention of Dolní Bukovsko is from 1323. It was probably founded by Ottokar II of Bohemia.

References

External links

Market towns in the Czech Republic
Populated places in České Budějovice District